The United States Federal Sentencing Guidelines are rules published by the U.S. Sentencing Commission that set out a uniform policy for sentencing individuals and organizations convicted of felonies and serious (Class A) misdemeanors in the United States federal courts system. The Guidelines do not apply to less serious misdemeanors or infractions.

Although the Guidelines were initially styled as mandatory, the US Supreme Court's 2005 decision in United States v. Booker held that the Guidelines, as originally constituted, violated the Sixth Amendment right to trial by jury, and the remedy chosen was to excise those provisions of the law establishing the Guidelines as mandatory. After Booker and other Supreme Court cases, such as Blakely v. Washington (2004), the Guidelines are now considered advisory only. Federal judges (state judges are not affected by the Guidelines) must calculate the guidelines and consider them when determining a sentence, but are not required to issue sentences within the guidelines.

History

Enabling legislation
The Guidelines are the product of the United States Sentencing Commission, which was created by the Sentencing Reform Act of 1984. The Guidelines' primary goal was to alleviate sentencing disparities that research had indicated were prevalent in the existing sentencing system, and the guidelines reform was specifically intended to provide for determinate sentencing. This refers to sentencing whose actual limits are determined at the time the sentence is imposed, as opposed to indeterminate sentencing, in which a sentence with a maximum (and, perhaps, a minimum) is pronounced but the actual amount of time served in prison is determined by a parole commission or similar administrative body after the person has started serving his or her sentence. As part of the guidelines reform in 1984, parole on federal level was abolished.

The federal effort followed guidelines projects in several states, initially funded by the United States Department of Justice, and led by Jack Kress and his research team during the late 1970s. The first sentencing guidelines jurisdictions were county-wide, in Denver, Newark, Chicago and Philadelphia. Statewide guidelines systems were next established in Utah, Minnesota, Pennsylvania, Maryland, Michigan, Washington, and Delaware, before the federal sentencing guidelines were formally adopted in 1987. Given that the vast majority of criminal sentencing is done at the state level, the American Law Institute and the American Bar Association have each recommended such systems for all the states, and nearly half the states presently have such systems, although significant variations exist among them. For example, Minnesota's Sentencing Guidelines Commission initially sought consciously not to increase prison capacity through guidelines. That is, Minnesota assumed that the legislature should determine how much would be spent on prisons and that the sentencing commission's job was to allocate those prison beds in as rational a way as possible. The federal effort took the opposite approach. It determined how many prisons would be needed and Congress was then essentially required to fund those beds.

Promulgation and modification
In drafting the first set of guidelines, the Commission used data drawn from 10,000 presentence investigations, the differing elements of various crimes as distinguished in substantive criminal statutes, the United States Parole Commission's guidelines and statistics, and data from other sources in order to determine which distinctions were important in pre-guidelines practice. Sentencing criteria already in use by judges was thus codified as guidelines. The Commission essentially codified existing practice. Future modifications often reflected Congressional mandates, as in the case of the Anti-Drug Abuse Act of 1986 that imposed increased and mandatory minimum sentences.

In 2003, Congress considered the Feeney Amendment to the PROTECT Act. This amendment would have totally rewritten the guidelines. Among other changes, the original amendment would have eliminated all unenumerated downward departures and all downward departures for family ties, diminished capacity, aberrant behavior, educational or vocational skills, mental or emotional conditions, employment record, good works, or overstated criminal history. Defense lawyers, law professors, current and former Sentencing Commissioners, the President of the American Bar Association, Chief Justice William Rehnquist, and others wrote to Congress opposing the amendment. The enacted bill limited the changes described above to crimes involving pornography, sexual abuse, child sex, and child kidnapping and trafficking. It also raised penalties for child pornography and child sex abuse. It also greatly increased prosecutorial discretion and influence by limiting judges' power to depart from the guidelines and granting prosecutors greater power over departures. For instance, it made a prosecutorial motion a prerequisite for a three-level reduction for acceptance of responsibility. It also instructed the Sentencing Commission to authorize four-level "fast-track" downward departures in illegal-reentry immigration cases upon motion of the prosecutor.

United States v. Booker
Though the Federal Sentencing Guidelines were styled as mandatory, the Supreme Court's 2005 decision in United States v. Booker found that the Guidelines, as originally constituted, violated the Sixth Amendment right to trial by jury, and the remedy chosen was excision of those provisions of the law establishing the Guidelines as mandatory. In the aftermath of Booker and other Supreme Court cases, such as Blakely v. Washington (2004), Guidelines are now considered advisory only. Federal judges (state judges are not affected by the Guidelines) must calculate the guidelines and consider them when determining a sentence but are not required to issue sentences within the guidelines. Those sentences are still, however, subject to appellate review. The frequency in which sentences are imposed that exceed the range stated in the Guidelines has doubled in the years since the Booker decision.

Guidelines basics 

The Guidelines determine sentences based primarily on two factors:
 the conduct associated with the offense (the offense conduct, which produces the offense level)
 the defendant's criminal history (the criminal history category)
The Sentencing Table in the Guidelines Manual shows the relationship between these two factors; for each pairing of offense level and criminal history category, the Table specifies a sentencing range, in months, within which the court may sentence a defendant. For example, for a defendant convicted on an offense with a total offense level of 22 and a criminal history category of I, the Guidelines recommend a sentence of 41–51 months. If, however, a person with an extensive criminal history (Category VI) committed the same offense in the same manner in the same modern timeline and not during the older guideline periods, the Guidelines would recommend a sentence of 84–105 months.

Offense level
There are 43 offense levels. The offense level of a defendant is determined by looking up the offense in Chapter 2 and applying any applicable adjustments. The originally proposed sentencing guidelines had 360 levels, and there are proposals to substantially reduce the current number of offense levels.

Criminal history
There are six criminal history categories. Each category is associated with a range of criminal history points. Thus, for example, a  defendant with 0 or 1 criminal history points would be in Criminal History Category I, while a defendant with 13 or more criminal history points would be in Criminal History Category VI. The criminal history points are calculated by adding 3 points for each prior sentence of imprisonment exceeding one year and one month; adding 2 points for each prior sentence of imprisonment of at least sixty days but not more than 13 months; adding 1 point for each prior sentence of less than sixty days; adding 2 points if the defendant committed the instant offense while under any criminal justice sentence, including probation, parole, supervised release, imprisonment, work release, or escape status; adding 2 points if the defendant committed the instant offense less than two years after release from imprisonment on a sentence of sixty days or more or while in imprisonment or escape status on such a sentence, except that if 2 points are added committing the offense while under a criminal justice sentence, adding only 1 point for this item; and adding 1 point for each prior sentence resulting from a conviction of a crime of violence that did not receive any points because such sentence was counted as a single sentence, up to a total of 3 points for this item.

The guidelines require "counting prior adult diversionary dispositions if they involved a judicial determination of guilt or an admission of guilt in open court." This reflects a policy that defendants who previously received the benefit of a rehabilitative sentence and then commit further crimes should not be treated with further leniency.

Zones
There are four sentencing zones: A, B, C, and D. Zone A consists of sentencing ranges of 0–6 months. Zone B consists of sentencing ranges above Zone A but with a maximum penalty of no more than 15 months. Zone C consists of sentencing ranges above Zone B but whose maximum penalty is 18 months or less. Zone D consists of sentencing ranges above Zone C.

A defendant in Zone A is eligible for Federal Probation, and no term of imprisonment is required. A split sentence is authorized for defendants in Zone C. That is, Zone C defendants must serve at least half of their sentence in prison.

In 2010, the U.S. Sentencing Commission proposed expanding Zones B and C, in recognition of the fact that many offenders are sentenced to 12 months and 1 day in order to receive the benefit of good time under U.S. federal law.

Adjustments

Reductions in time to be served
A 2- or 3-level offense level decrease is typically granted for acceptance of responsibility if the defendant accepts a plea bargain. However, the decrease will not apply if the defendant demonstrates behavior, such as continued criminal activity, that is inconsistent with acceptance of responsibility.

Increase in time to be served
There are victim-related adjustments for hate crime motivation or vulnerable victims; official victims; restraint of victims; and terrorism. Adjustments can apply depending on the offender's role in the offense, which can include an aggravating role, a mitigating role. Enhancements apply for abuse of a position of trust or use of a special skill, using a minor to commit a crime, and use of body armor or a firearm in drug trafficking crimes and crimes of violence.

In addition, there are enhancements related to obstruction of justice, including obstructing or impeding the administration of justice, reckless endangerment during flight, commission of an offense while on release, and false registration of a domain name.

Adjustments also apply in cases involving multiple counts.

Departures
Departures upward or downward from the guideline range are appropriate for cases that deviate from the heartland of cases.

Departures are allowed in cases involving substantial assistance to authorities in the investigation or prosecution of another person who has committed an offense. Indeed, the Sentencing Reform Act even allows a departure below the applicable statutory mandatory minimum in such cases. There is no penalty for refusal to assist authorities.

The Federal Rules of Criminal Procedure and U.S. Sentencing Guidelines require that the prosecution file a motion allowing the reduction. The court is not required to grant the reduction, and may decline to do so if it deems the information provided by the defendant to be untruthful, incomplete, unreliable, insignificant, not useful, or untimely. The Guidelines provide, "Substantial weight should be given to the government's evaluation of the extent of the defendant's assistance, particularly where the extent and value of the assistance are difficult to ascertain."

Some defendants attempt to provide substantial assistance, but their assistance is ultimately deemed not to be substantial, which prevents them from getting the departure even if they made incriminating statements.

Other grounds for departure:

Death (§5K2.1)

Physical injury (§5K2.2)

Extreme psychological injury (§5K2.3)

Abduction or unlawful restraint (§5K2.4)

Property damage or loss (§5K2.5)

Weapons and dangerous instrumentalities (§5K2.6)

Disruption of governmental function (§5K2.7)

Extreme conduct (§5K2.8)

Criminal purpose (§5K2.9)

Victim's conduct (§5K2.10)

Lesser harms (§5K2.11)

Coercion and duress (§5K2.12)

Diminished capacity (§5K2.13)

Public welfare (§5K2.14)

Voluntary disclosure of offense (§5K2.16)

Semiautomatic firearms capable of accepting large capacity magazines (§5K2.17)

Violent street gangs (§5K2.18)

Post-sentencing rehabilitative efforts (§5K2.19)
Prior to October 2010:

After Pepper v. United States (2011) but before November 1, 2012:

After November 1, 2012:

Aberrant behavior (§5K2.20)

Dismissed and uncharged conduct (§5K2.21)

Specific offender characteristics as grounds for downward departure in child crimes and sexual offenses (§5K2.22)

Discharged terms of imprisonment (§5K2.23)

Commission of offense while wearing or displaying unauthorized or counterfeit insignia or uniform (§5K2.24)

Controversies
Among the controversial aspects of the Sentencing Guidelines have been the 100:1 disparity between treatment of crack and cocaine (which has been amended to 18:1 by the Fair Sentencing Act of 2010) and the immigration guidelines which call for hefty enhancements for illegal re-entrants with prior felony records, despite the prior offenses already being taken into account via the Criminal History Category. Heavy penalties for child pornography offenders have also come under fire. Many judges are refusing to apply the Guidelines in these cases.

It has been argued that the Sentencing Guidelines actually increase unwarranted sentencing disparities. Joseph S. Hall writes, "Factors such as whether or not the defendant can afford a skilled attorney capable of making innovative legal arguments or performing detailed factual investigations have a profound influence on a defendant's sentence. The prosecutor's power to extract guilty pleas, previously held in check by judges, is now counterbalanced only by the diligence of the defense attorney." William J. Stuntz claims that "when necessary, the litigants simply bargain about what facts will (and won't) form the basis for sentencing. It seems to be an iron rule: guidelines sentencing empowers prosecutors, even where the guidelines' authors try to fight that tendency ... In short, plea bargains outside the law's shadow depend on prosecutors' ability to make credible threats of severe post-trial sentences. Sentencing guidelines make it easy to issue those threats."

The federal guilty plea rate has risen from 83% in 1983 to 96% in 2009, a rise attributed largely to the Sentencing Guidelines.

Sentencing table
The sentencing table is an integral part of the U.S. Sentencing Guidelines.

The Offense Level (1–43) forms the vertical axis of the Sentencing Table. The Criminal History Category (I–VI) forms the horizontal axis of the Table. The intersection of the Offense Level and Criminal History Category displays the Guideline Range in months of imprisonment. "Life" means life imprisonment. For example, the guideline range applicable to a defendant with an Offense Level of 15 and a Criminal History Category of III is 24–30 months of imprisonment. If all counts that carry the maximum sentence of 5–40 years total the level to 43 and above, then a life sentence is restricted. For a defendant under the Juvenile Delinquency Act, the sentence is 50 years for Levels 43 and up.

Fines
For individuals, the fine table is as follows:

The Guidelines state that the court can impose a fine above the maximum set out in the table if the defendant is convicted under a statute authorizing a maximum fine greater than $250,000, or a fine for each day of violation. The court can waive the fine if the defendant is unlikely to be able to pay or if the fine would unduly burden the defendant's dependents; however, the Guidelines state that the court must still impose a total combined sanction that is punitive.

Probation and supervised release
The Guidelines state that the term of probation shall be at least one year but not more than five years if the offense level is 6 or greater, and no more than three years in any other case. The Guidelines provide that the term of supervised release under U.S. federal law shall be at least three years but not more than five years for a defendant convicted of a Class A or B felony; at least two years but not more than three years for a defendant convicted of a Class C or D felony; and one year for a defendant convicted of a Class E felony or a Class A misdemeanor. Supervised release is recommended by the Guidelines for most offenders who are serving a prison sentence of more than a year.

See also 
 Apprendi v. New Jersey
 Fair Sentencing Act
 History of United States Prison Systems
 Safety valve (law)
 United States v. Binion

References

Further reading

External links 
 United States Sentencing Commission website
 2012 Federal Sentencing Guidelines Manual
 Federal Sentencing Guidelines Manual Archives (1994-2009)
 Sentencing Guidelines Calculator

 
United States federal law
United States sentencing law